Trigonophora is a genus of moths of the family Noctuidae.

Species
 Trigonophora clava Wileman, 1912
 Trigonophora crassicornis (Oberthür, 1918)
 Trigonophora flammea (Esper, 1785)
 Trigonophora haasi (Staudinger, 1891)
 Trigonophora jodea (Herrich-Schäffer, 1850)

References

Trigonophora at funet

Cuculliinae